Flea-borne spotted fever or California pseudotyphus is a condition characterized by a rash of maculopapules or furuncles.

It is caused by Rickettsia felis.

See also 
 American tick bite fever
 Japanese spotted fever
 List of cutaneous conditions

References

External links 

Bacterium-related cutaneous conditions
Rickettsioses